Bone Chillers is a series of children's horror fiction novels and a TV show created and authored by Betsy Haynes.

Synopsis
Four freshmen at Edgar Allan Poe High School not only have to deal with the normal pressures of competing with the cool kids and the jocks but also have to contend with all sorts of weird happenings. Similar to Goosebumps, the stories that were originally about different people in each book were all changed to the setting of a haunted high school to provide a continuing cast. Assisting the main characters was Arnie the custodian, who lived in the school's basement. There was the feared cook of the school, Carl, the ditzy Miss Dewberry, and the evil Principal Percival Pussman. Only three episodes of the TV series were adapted from books; the others were all original (although the episode, Romeo and Ghouliette, was later adapted into the 23rd and final entry in the book series).

At the end of each episode, original author Betsy Haynes would appear in an educational segment encouraging young viewers to exercise their imaginations.

Although Betsy Haynes is the creator of the Bone Chillers series, some titles were written by other authors.

Cast
 Esteban Powell as Brian Holsapple
 Trey Alexander as Kirk
 Linda Cardellini as Sarah
 John Patrick White as Fitzgerald Crump
 Saadia Persad as Lexi
 Danielle Weeks as Tiffany
 Erick Avari as Dr. Lumbago
 Charles Fleischer as Arnie
 Josh Hecox as Dr. Feelgood
 Ron Jeremy as Blisterface
 Arthur Burghardt as Principal Pussman

Episodes

Releases
Selected episodes were released on 3 VHS volumes in 1997 and have still not been released on DVD. All titles below remain out of print.

Bone Chillers book series
Beware the Shopping Mall: Robin goes on a shopping spree in Wonderland Mall - where the mannequins take over the personalities of her friends and only by being lured out of the mall can the real children reclaim their bodies.
Little Pet Shop of Horrors: Cassie discovers that the new pet shop in town turns kids into dogs.
Back to School: Fitz thinks there's something strange about the new school cook when his friends become addicted to the food and gain monstrous appetites.
Frankenturkey: A zombified turkey goes after students Kyle and Annie.
Strange Brew: Wanting to make her life more interesting, Tori finds a notebook full of spells—and runs into trouble when she can't control the magic.
Teacher Creature: Joey and Nate discover that their new science teacher is a mutant frog who likes to eat sixth graders.
Frankenturkey II: Frankenturkey returns from the grave after Kyle and Annie make wishes on his wishbone and goes after them again.
Welcome to Alien Inn: Stranded at an inn during a blizzard, Matt enjoys the snow and the time off from school until he learns that the innkeeper and all the other guests are aliens who have come to Earth to study human life.
Attack of the Killer Ants: Disgusted by the multitude of red ants that threaten the school picnic, Ryan and Alex go on an ant-squashing spree, only to be targeted by a huge, hairy monster of an ant that wants to make the boys into slaves.
Slime Time: The mucus from Jeremy's sneeze turns into a blob threatening to eat everyone in town.
Toilet Terror (Elizabeth Winfrey): Hans and Ellie do battle against a slimy monster who lives in their toilet.
Night of the Living Clay (David Bergantino): Tasha fights back against a band of clay monsters living in the basement of her house.
The Thing Under the Bed (Daniel Ehrenhaft): A boy fights back against a creature hiding under his bed.
A Terminal Case of the Uglies (David Bergantino): A new school photographer is turning the student body into monsters.
Tiki Doll of Doom (Michael Burgan): Lucy gets a tiki doll necklace from her aunt, which has the power to turn her dreams into reality.
Queen of the Gargoyles (Gene Hult): During a visit to her aunt's apartment building, Isabella discovers that the gargoyles decorating the place are alive...and her aunt may be their queen.
Why I Quit the Baby-Sitter's Club (Unknown, mistakenly credited to David Bergantino): Rosie, a reluctant young sitter, agrees to sit for her new neighbors—whose "child" is a real monster.
blowtorch@psycho.com (Sherry Shahan): Jason's story about a psycho killer known as Blowtorch comes to life the more he saves his story on his computer's hard drive.
Night Squawker (Dahlia Kosinski): Paul discovers that his new pet parrot has the power to predict doom.
Scare Bear (Gene Hult): Tim throws out his childhood teddy bear—who begins to haunt him.
The Dog Ate My Homework: Azie Appleton and her friends have the power to make any lie come true—but get in over their heads when they unleash giant termites.
Killer Clown of Kings County (Daniel Ehrenhaft): Zeke becomes the assistant to a clown who is a master at dark magic.
Romeo and Ghouliette (Ryan Chipman): Lexi suspects a new girl, Julie who ends up becoming a monster—with Lexi's friend Fitz as the main course.

In French, the series is known as "Froid Dans le Dos" (which translates to "Cold in the Back") and follows a different order than the American version. Only fifteen of the original books were published in this line, but the fifteenth book, "Le Homard en Cavale" (which translates to "The Lobster on the Run") seems to be exclusive to this line, as it is about a lobster going after two kids on Christmas, which bears no resemblance to any books in the original English line.

Similarity to Goosebumps

This series is similar in style and tone to the very popular Goosebumps series. Other children's horror series from the 1990s include Are You Afraid of the Dark?, Deadtime Stories, Shivers, Graveyard School, Phantom Valley, Spinetinglers, Spooksville and Shadow Zone.

External links

 

Series of children's books
1990s American children's comedy television series
1990s American high school television series
1990s American horror comedy television series
1996 American television series debuts
1996 American television series endings
American Broadcasting Company original programming
American children's fantasy television series
American children's horror television series
American horror novels
American television shows based on children's books
Television series about teenagers
Television series by Hyperion Pictures
Television series by Disney–ABC Domestic Television
Book series introduced in 1994